The Darwin Surf Life Saving Club is a foundation member of the surf lifesaving movement in the Northern Territory. It was founded in 1982 on the Casuarina Coastal Reserve in Casuarina, Northern Territory

See also

Surf lifesaving
Surf Life Saving Australia
List of Australian surf lifesaving clubs

References

External links
 
 

1982 establishments in Australia
Sports clubs established in 1982
Surf Life Saving Australia clubs
Sports teams in the Northern Territory
Sport in Darwin, Northern Territory